Mohamed Moatassim, born 1956 in Settat, is a Moroccan scholar and politician who currently serves as advisor to King Mohammed VI.

Biography 
After getting his degree in political science at the Mohammed V University in Rabat in 1977 and a Diploma of Advanced Studies (DES) at the University of Hassan II Casablanca in 1983, Moatassim gave his doctoral dissertation in political sciences on "The Traditionalist Evolution of Moroccan Constitutional Law".

On November 11, 1993, he was appointed Minister Delegate to the Prime Minister for the Government of Lamrani VI of Morocco. On June 7, 1994, he was reappointed to the same post for the Government of  Filali I of Morocco.

On February 25, 1995, he was appointed to the position of Chargé de Mission at the Royal Office of Morocco. Four years later, he was appointed as advisor to King Mohammed VI.

Moatassim was a member of the Constitutional Council of Morocco from 1999 to 2002 and the Advisory Council on Human Rights (CCHR) from 2007 to 2011.

Awards and decorations 

 In 1995, he was awarded the Knight class of the Order of the Throne.
 In July 2004, he was awarded the Commander class of the Order of the Throne.
 In 2004, he was appointed Commander of the National Order of the Legion of Honour of the French Republic.

Works 

 "Le système politique marocain" Casablanca, Ed. Isis, 1992
 "La vie politique marocaine : 1962 – 1992" Casablanca, Ed. Isis, 1992
 "L'expérience parlementaire au Maroc" (Collective work) Casablanca, Ed. Toubkal, 1984
 "Théorie générale du Droit Constitutionnel" Casablanca, Ed. Isis, 1988
 "Les systèmes politiques comparés" Casablanca, Ed. Isis, 1989
 Several studies and articles on public law and political science, published in specialized scientific and academic journals and publications.

Notes and references 

1956 births
Living people
Moroccan royal advisors
Moroccan political scientists
University of Hassan II Casablanca alumni
Mohammed V University alumni
Advisors of Mohammed VI of Morocco